Brigady 2 is a rural locality (a settlement) in Politotdelskoye Rural Settlement, Nikolayevsky District, Volgograd Oblast, Russia. The population was 19 as of 2010. There are 2 streets.

Geography 
Brigady 2 is located in steppe, on the left bank of the Volgograd Reservoir, 36 km northeast of Nikolayevsk (the district's administrative centre) by road. Levchunovka is the nearest rural locality.

References 

Rural localities in Nikolayevsky District, Volgograd Oblast